Iraklis Mitsopoulos (1816–1892) was an author, biologist, archaeologist, physicist, zoologist, paleontologist, mineralogist, geologist, and professor. He is considered the father of modern natural sciences in Greece.  He taught classes for over forty-seven years of his life.  His nephew world renowned Greek geologist Konstantinos M. Mitsopoulos became the first student to receive a doctorate degree in the natural sciences at the University of Athens. His son Maximos Mitsopoulos also became a geologist.  Hercules co-founded the Museum of Physical Geography in Athens, Greece, and directed its Zoological Department.  He was the founder and lifelong President of the Zoological Department at the Museum of Paleontology, Geology, Zoology, and Botany (Παλαιοντολογικό, Γεωλογικό, Ζωολογικό και Βοτανικό Μουσείο). The museum is part of the University of Athens.  He built the framework of modern Greek natural scientific education.

He was born in Patras. He was given a scholarship by Ioannis Kapodistrias to study in Germany. He attended the University of Munich during the 1830s. Afterward, he studied at the University of Berlin from 1838 to 1844. Hercules returned to Greece and taught physics, logic, psychology, physical geography, zoology, paleontology, mineralogy, and geology for over forty-seven years.  Hercules served as Dean of the School of Philosophy which was part of the University of Athens four times. He was also the president of the University of Athens during the academic year 1864–1865.  He participated in the paleontological excavations at Pikermi, and in 1866, along with Greek chemist Anastasios Christomanos, researched the volcanic eruption of the Santorini caldera. Mitsopoulos wrote articles on the natural sciences. He died in 1892 in Athens, Greece.

Biography 
Iraklis Mitsopoulos was born in Patras in 1816.  His father's name was Anastasios, descended from the Rizou family of Epirus.  Iraklis received his early education on the island of Aegina.  With a scholarship awarded by Ioannis Kapodistrias, he started attending the University of Munich from 1834 to 1837. Hercules graduated with a philosophy degree, which at the time encompassed the natural sciences.  Chemistry, biology, physics, mathematics, zoology, botany, geology, and mineralogy were part of the field of study. Friedrich Wilhelm Joseph Schelling was one of his teachers.  Iraklis continued his education at the University of Berlin from 1838 to 1844, when he returned to Greece.
    
Mitsopoulos became the first professor of natural history in Greece.  He initially taught physical geography. As the natural sciences were not separated from the philosophical school until the early 1900s, he joined the philosophical school at the University of Athens. He taught zoology, paleontology, mineralogy, and geology for over forty-seven years.

By 1848, Mitsopoulos also taught physics, logic, and psychology at the Rizarios School and the Arsakeio School for Girls.  He was a member and president of the Society of the Friends of Education. From the years 1851–1855, he became a member of the Scientific Association of Archaeological Society.  In 1853, he played an active role in the paleontological excavations at Pikermi in Athens, Greece.

Mitsopoulos served as Dean of the School of Philosophy four times.  He was also the president of the University of Athens during the academic year 1864–1865.  Anastasios Christomanos and Mitsopoulos played a pivotal scientific role at the volcanic eruption of the Santorini caldera in 1866.  Christomanos brought the spectroscope to Greece and used the instrument to study the volcano. In 1867, Mitsopoulos wrote a book about the earthquakes of Aigio and Kefalonia. Mitsopoulos wrote different articles on the physical sciences.  He was co-founder of the Museum of Physical Geography, and director of its Zoological Department.  He was the founder and lifelong President of the Zoological Museum, located in the north wing of the university's main building.  Several paleontological species were named after him.

Literary Works

References

Bibliography

1816 births
1892 deaths
19th-century Greek educators
19th-century Greek scientists
Academic staff of the National and Kapodistrian University of Athens
Greek physicists
Greek archaeologists
Greek geologists
Humboldt University of Berlin alumni
Ludwig Maximilian University of Munich alumni
Scientists from Patras